Ethel is a U.S. town in Attala County, Mississippi. The population was 418 at the 2010 census.

History
Ethel is named for the daughter of Capt. S. B. McConnico.
The mayor of Ethel is Gwen Sims.

Geography
Ethel is located along the Yockanookany River.

Demographics

As of the census of 2000, there were 452 people, 173 households, and 125 families residing in the town. The population density was 752.3 people per square mile (290.9/km). There were 208 housing units at an average density of 346.2 per square mile (133.8/km). The racial makeup of the town was 54.42% White, 44.91% African American, and 0.66% from two or more races. Hispanic or Latino of any race were 0.44% of the population.

There were 173 households, out of which 39.9% had children under the age of 18 living with them, 43.4% were married couples living together, 22.5% had a female householder with no husband present, and 27.7% were non-families. 25.4% of all households were made up of individuals, and 11.6% had someone living alone who was 65 years of age or older. The average household size was 2.61 and the average family size was 3.07.

In the town, the population was spread out, with 28.8% under the age of 18, 10.8% from 18 to 24, 26.3% from 25 to 44, 21.7% from 45 to 64, and 12.4% who were 65 years of age or older. The median age was 32 years. For every 100 females, there were 98.2 males. For every 100 females age 18 and over, there were 83.0 males.

The median income for a household in the town was $20,114, and the median income for a family was $21,667. Males had a median income of $22,083 versus $13,409 for females. The per capita income for the town was $8,240. About 30.4% of families and 32.8% of the population were below the poverty line, including 48.5% of those under age 18 and 19.3% of those age 65 or over.

Education
The town of Ethel is served by the Attala County School District.

Notable people
Ray Butts, inventor of the EchoSonic and FilterTron
Icey W. Day, member of the Mississippi House of Representatives for three separate terms
Archie Dees, professional basketball player.

References

Towns in Attala County, Mississippi
Towns in Mississippi